Located about  east of the central business district, Osu is a neighborhood in central Accra, Ghana. It is locally known as the "West End" of Accra. Bounded to the south by the Gulf of Guinea, Osu's western boundary is the Independence Avenue. Osu is separated from the northern district of Labone by Ring Road.

Due to its establishment as a settlement in the 17th century, Osu has a mix of houses dating from the early 20th century and modern office towers. Ringway Estates, a gated residential community between Gamel Abdul Nasser Avenue and Cantonments Road is located in the western section of Osu.

The main thoroughfare, Oxford Street has large supermarkets and appliance shops. At its southern end is the site of the 17th-century Fort Christiansborg, a former Danish colonial fort, which formerly housed the seat of government before being relocated to Golden Jubilee House.

Economy
The head office of Starbow is in Osu.

Landmarks/places of interest
 Accra International Conference Center
 Accra Ridge Church
 Accra Sports Stadium
 Black Star Square
 Ebenezer Presbyterian Church, Osu
 Independence Arch
 Osu Castle (also known as Fort Christiansborg)
 Parliament House of Ghana
 Ridge Church School
 Greater Accra Regional Hospital

References

External links

 

Geography of Ghana
Accra